Julien Mertine (born 26 June 1988) is a French right-handed foil fencer, four-time team European champion, 2014 team world champion, and 2021 team Olympic champion.

Career

Mertine took up fencing at the age of five with his father, a fencing master who trained amongst others World champion Victor Sintès. When he was eighteen he joined the centre for promising young fencers at Châtenay-Malabry. He earned a team bronze medal at the 2007 Junior European Championships in Prag and at the 2008 Junior World Championships in Acireale. In 2009 he was admitted into INSEP, a state-sponsored institution for high-performance athletes.

Mertine climbed in 2010 his first World Cup podium with a bronze medal in Copenhague, and was selected into the France national team as a reserve. His first competition with the team was the 2011 Challenge International in Paris, in which France finished 5th. 117th in world rankings, Mertine won the Havana World Cup that same season after defeating Italy's Giorgio Avola in the final.

In the 2012–13 season, he earned a bronze medal in the Seoul World Cup and in the Tokyo Grand Prix, but ceded to Belarus' Siarhei Byk in the first round of the European Championships in Zagreb. In the team event, France was overcome by Great Britain in the first round. At the World Championships in Budapest Mertine defeated Great Britain's Richard Kruse in the first round, but was then beaten by Heo Jun of South Korea. He was replaced in the team event by Enzo Lefort. He finished the season No.19, his best ranking as of 2014.

In the 2013–14 season Mertine won the national French championships after defeating successively Enzo Lefort and Erwann Le Péchoux. At the European Championships in Strasbourg he lost 14–15 in the table of 16 to Alexander Choupenitch of the Czech Republic. In the team event France defeated the Czech Republic and Italy before prevailing over Italy, allowing Mertine to win his first gold medal in a major event. At the World Championships in Kazan he was defeated 13–15 in the preliminary table of 64 by Israel's Tomer Or after leading 13–7. In the team event France defeated Russia in the semi-finals and proceeded to crush China to earn the world title.

Mertine passed his fencing master certificate when he was nineteen. He now teaches fencing at his own club in Rueil-Malmaison and at CE Orgeval-Villennes.

Medal Record

Olympic Games

World Championship

European Championship

Grand Prix

World Cup

References

External links

Profile at the European Fencing Championships

1988 births
Living people
French male foil fencers
Sportspeople from Saint-Germain-en-Laye
Olympic fencers of France
Olympic medalists in fencing
Fencers at the 2020 Summer Olympics
Medalists at the 2020 Summer Olympics
Olympic gold medalists for France